The HP-34C continuous memory calculator was an advanced scientific programmable calculator of the HP 30 series. It was produced between 1979 (cost US$150) and 1983 (cost US$100).

Features

Root-finding and integration 
Significant to the HP-34C calculator was the capability for integration and root-finding (a first for any pocket calculator). Integration and root-finding worked by having the user input a formula as a program. This technique for multiple root-finding is referred to as "deflation". The user would usually programmatically recall the root value from a storage register to improve its precision.

Programming
The common method of converting registers to program memory allowed the calculator a maximum of 210 program steps. Programming features such as indirect jumps provided substantial capability to the calculator's programmer.

The HP-34C shipped with an "applications" manual that included two games (Moon Rocket Lander and Nimb). This made the calculator probably one of the first pocket game computers ever invented. The winner was announced via calculator spelling by turning the display upside down and the words BLISS or I'LOSE (55178 or 3507,1) were displayed. A game of blackjack was easily programmable by converting some of the registers to lines of program.

Pedigree
The calculator was superseded, in 1982, by the HP-15C.

Although it is argued the HP-41C (introduced late 1979 and only a matter of months after the HP-34C) was a replacement for the HP-34C, they were in fact differentiated as much by price (the HP-34C being 50% that of the HP-41C) as by functionality and performance (the HP-41C being the first HP LCD-based and module-expandable calculator, with its standard functionality lacking the root-finding and integration capabilities as well as the gamma-function implementation of the HP-34C though). This price difference allowed those with economic constraints to still buy a high-end HP (HP-34C) scientific programmable within a reasonable cost. As such they were sold side-by-side for a number of years.

Design
The HP-34C came in a number of variants, such as plastic- and metal-keyboard versions and those with soldered (later 1983 variants) vs pressure-mounted circuitry (earlier variants 1979–1983).

See also 
 List of Hewlett-Packard products: Pocket calculators
 HP calculators

References

External links 
 
 

34C